Julija or Jūlija is a feminine given name. Notable people with the name include:

Julija Beniuseviciute (1845–1921), Lithuanian/Samogitian writer (pen name Žemaitė)
Julija Matej (born 1925), Serbian athlete
Julija Portjanko (born 1983), Macedonian handball player
Julija Pranaitytė (1881–1944), Lithuanian newspaper editor, book publisher, and traveller
Jūlija Sokolova (born 1991), Latvian football striker
Julija Stepanenko (born 1977), Latvian politician and lawyer
Julija Stoliarenko (born 1993), Lithuanian mixed martial arts and Lethwei fighter
Jūlija Vansoviča (born 1975), Latvian fencer

See also
Yuliya, given name
Julia, given name

Lithuanian feminine given names
Latvian feminine given names
Serbian feminine given names
Croatian feminine given names
Macedonian feminine given names